OPI may refer to:

Organizations
 Order of Perpetual Indulgence or Sisters of Perpetual Indulgence
 The Office of Police Integrity, Victoria, Australia

Science and technology
 Open Payment Initiative
 Ocular protection index

Places
 Opi, Abruzzo, a comune in Italy
 Opi (archaeological site), Enugu State, Nigeria

Other uses
 Over the phone interpreting
 Oral Proficiency Interview
 OPI Products, a US nail polish manufacturer
 Opi, an Igbo musical instrument
 Oremus Pro Invicem, Latin for Let us Pray for each other (see List of Latin phrases (O))